The Alice Okolo Bridge (also known as Abonnema-Obonoma Bridge) is a culvert bridge in Akuku-Toru local government area connecting the town of Obonoma to the town of Abonnema. Construction of the bridge began in 2003 but was abandoned during the administration of Chibuike Amaechi. It was later was completed and commissioned by Governor Ezenwo Wike on 1 September 2015.

References

2010s establishments in Rivers State
Buildings and structures in Rivers State
Bridges in Rivers State
2015 establishments in Nigeria
Bridges completed in 2015
21st-century architecture in Nigeria